Prodoridunculus is a genus of sea slugs, dorid nudibranchs, shell-less marine gastropod mollusks in the family Akiodorididae.

Species 
 Prodoridunculus gaussianus  Thiele, 1912

References

Akiodorididae